Tavassoli or Tavasoli is a surname. Notable people with the surname include:

Ali Reza Tavassoli (1962–2015), Afghan military officer
Hanieh Tavassoli (born 1979), Iranian actress
Mohammad-Reza Tavassoli (1931–2008), Iranian theologian and politician
Mohammad Tavassoli (born 1938), Iranian activist and politician